Bernie Lee (born 20 March 1937) is a former Australian rules footballer who played with Footscray in the Victorian Football League (VFL).

Lee was Footscray's full-back in the 1961 VFL Grand Final, which they lost. He could also play across halfback.

References

External links
 
 

1937 births
Australian rules footballers from Victoria (Australia)
Western Bulldogs players
Living people